The province of Macerata is a province in the Marche region of Italy. Its capital is the city of Macerata. The province includes 55 comunes (Italian: comuni) in the province, see Comunes of the Province of Macerata. Located between the rivers Potenza (Flosis) and Chienti, both of which originate in the province, the city of Macerata is located on a hill.

The province contains, among the numerous historical sites, the Roman settlement of Helvia Recina, destroyed by orders of Alaric I, King of the Visigoths, in 408. The province was part of the Papal States from 1445 (with an interruption during the French invasion during the Napoleonic Wars), until the unification of Italy in 1860. The University of Macerata was formed in the province in 1260 and was known as the University of the Piceno from 1540, when Pope Paul III issued a bull naming it this. The town of Camerino, home to another historical university, is also located in the region.

Cingoli was founded in the province as Cingulum, also known as "The Balcony of the Marche" due to its views of the surroundings. Tolentino was founded by the Romans as Tolentinum, while Recanati is widely known as the birthplace of poet Giacomo Leopardi. Massimo Girotti, an actor, was born in Mogliano in the province of Macerata. 

The two largest comuni are Macerata and Civitanova Marche, both with c. 40,000 inhabitants.

References

External links
Official website

 
Macerata